Brendan Thomas Byrne (April 1, 1924 – January 4, 2018) was an American politician, statesman, and prosecutor, serving as the 47th governor of New Jersey from 1974 to 1982.

A member of the Democratic Party, Byrne started his career as a private attorney and worked in the New Jersey state government starting in 1955 before resuming his legal career after leaving office in 1982.

During his time as governor, Byrne oversaw the opening of the first gambling casinos in Atlantic City, expanded the oceanside municipality's economic base, and established the New Jersey Department of the Public Advocate. He also saved a large majority of woodlands and wildlife areas in the state from development.

In the late 1960s, an FBI wiretap recorded local mobsters calling Byrne "the man who couldn't be bought," a reference to his high ethical standards. The public's response to this propelled his popularity during an era when many New Jersey politicians were being mired in corruption scandals. Byrne used the quote as the slogan for his successful election bid.

From 1981 to 1996, the Meadowlands Arena at the Meadowlands Sports Complex in East Rutherford, New Jersey, formerly home to the New Jersey Devils of the National Hockey League, New Jersey Nets of the National Basketball Association, and Seton Hall Pirates men's basketball was named Brendan Byrne Arena in his honor. The arena was then renamed Continental Airlines Arena, followed by IZOD Center.

Brendan Byrne State Forest, located in New Lisbon, New Jersey was also named in his honor.

In 2011, Byrne was inducted into the New Jersey Hall of Fame for his service to the state.

Early life and education
Byrne was born and raised in West Orange, New Jersey. He was the fourth child among five of Irish American Catholic parents Francis A. Byrne (1886–1974), a local public safety commissioner, and Genevieve Brennan Byrne (1888–1969).

In 1942, Byrne graduated from West Orange High School, where he had served as both the president of the debate club and senior class president. He briefly enrolled at Seton Hall University, only to leave in March the following year to join the U.S. Army. During World War II, Byrne served in the U.S. Army Air Forces as a navigator on a B-17, receiving the Distinguished Flying Cross and four Air Medals. By the time of his discharge from active service in 1945, he had achieved the rank of lieutenant.

After the war, Byrne attended Princeton University for two years, where he studied in the School of Public and International Affairs.  Due to the war, he spent only two years on campus, finishing his undergraduate thesis while enrolled at Harvard Law School. He graduated from Princeton in 1949 after completing a 95-page long senior thesis titled "Proportional Representation in Municipal Government", and went on to obtain his law degree from Harvard Law School in 1951.

Prior to entering public service, Byrne worked as a private attorney, first for the Newark law firm of John W. McGeehan, Jr., and later for the East Orange firm of Teltser and Greenberg.

Political career
In October 1955, Byrne was appointed an assistant counsel to Governor Robert B. Meyner. The following year he became the Governor's acting executive secretary. In 1958, Byrne was appointed the deputy attorney general responsible for the Essex County Prosecutor's Office. The following year, Governor Meyner appointed him as the Essex County Prosecutor.  Governor Hughes reappointed Byrne to this same office in 1964 following the end of his first five-year term. From 1968 to 1970, Byrne served as the president of the Board of Public Utilities Commissioners.

In 1970, Byrne was appointed by Governor William T. Cahill to the Superior Court. He served as the assignment judge for Morris, Sussex, and Warren Counties starting in 1972. In April 1973, Byrne resigned from the Superior court to run for governor.

1973 gubernatorial victory

Byrne defeated Ann Klein and Ralph DeRose in the 1973 Democratic primary to win the party's nomination for governor. In the November general election, Byrne won by beating the Republican nominee Congressman Charles Sandman in a landslide. Sandman had defeated the incumbent Governor Cahill in the primary. Byrne's landslide margin of victory was so vast that it allowed Democrats to capture control both chambers of the state legislature with supermajorities.

First term as governor of New Jersey
On January 15, 1974, Byrne was sworn in as the 47th governor of New Jersey.

Some of the policies enacted by the first Byrne administration include: the implementation of New Jersey's first state income tax, the establishment of spending limits on local governments, county governments, school districts, and the state, the establishment of both the Department of the Public Advocate and the Department of Energy, and the implementation of public financing for future gubernatorial general elections. Although Byrne claimed during the 1973 campaign that a personal income tax would not be necessary for "the foreseeable future", he eventually "muscled through" the unpopular income tax, New Jersey's first, in 1976; it earned him the nickname "One-Term Byrne".

1977 gubernatorial reelection

Byrne faced ten opponents in the 1977 Democratic primary, including future governor James Florio. However, Byrne obtained the party's nomination, and went on to defeat his Republican opponent, State Senator Raymond Bateman, in the general election on November 8, 1977. This despite the fact that in early 1977, three-quarters of voters disapproved of his job performance and in polls taken in the summer, he trailed Bateman by 17 points.

Byrne and Bateman debated nine times and Byrne used the governorship to his advantage, signing bills and appearing with cabinet members all over the state, benefiting from a visit by President Carter and turning what was his biggest weakness, the income tax, into a strength. Shortly before the 1977 gubernatorial election, New Jersey homeowners began receiving rebate checks (funded by state income tax revenues) to offset their property taxes, while Bateman's plan—replacing the state income tax with an increased sales tax—was widely criticized.

Until 2021, Byrne was the last Democrat to win re-election as Governor in New Jersey.

Second term as governor of New Jersey
During his second term, Byrne focused on policies such as: the passage of the Pinelands Protection Act, expansion of major highways, including the Atlantic City Expressway and Interstate 287, upgrades to sewage systems, further development of the Meadowlands Sports Complex, and casino-hotel development in Atlantic City.  He is one of only two Democrats, also including incumbent Phil Murphy, to be elected governor twice in the past fifty years. The other Governors elected to two terms (Thomas Kean, Christie Whitman, and Chris Christie) have all been Republicans.

Cabinet and administration

Post-governorship

After leaving office in 1982, Governor Byrne became a senior partner at Carella, Byrne, Bain, Gilfillan, Cecchi, Stewart & Olstein in Roseland, New Jersey (now Carella, Byrne, Cecchi, Olstein, Brody and Agnello, P.C.).  Additionally, Byrne and his successor as governor, Thomas Kean, co-wrote a weekly column in The Star-Ledger, containing their "dialogue" on state and national public affairs and politics. He has also taught courses at Princeton University and Rutgers University.

In 2014, Donald Linky, Byrne's former chief counsel, published a biography of the former governor called New Jersey Governor Brendan Byrne: The Man Who Couldn't Be Bought.

Despite not supporting all of his policies, Byrne said that Governor Chris Christie should run for president in 2016, calling Christie "the best candidate that the Republicans have" and complimented his "charm".

2010 assault
On February 16, 2010, while vacationing in London with his wife, Byrne was punched in the face by a mentally ill man near Waterloo tube station. The attacker was subsequently restrained by a London Underground station supervisor who came to Byrne's aid until the police arrived. Byrne, who had taken part in a "staged charity boxing match with Muhammad Ali in 1979", joked: "At least I didn't fall down at Waterloo, as when I fought Ali."

Personal life
On June 27, 1953, he married Jean Featherly, with whom he had seven children. Jean and Brendan Byrne divorced in 1993. Byrne married his second wife, Ruth Zinn, who was also divorced, in 1994. Jean Byrne died in 2015 of babesiosis, aged 88.

Death
Byrne died on January 4, 2018, in Livingston, New Jersey, of a lung infection at the age of 93.

His funeral was held on January 8 at the Paper Mill Playhouse in Millburn, New Jersey. Archbishop Joseph W. Tobin, then-Governor Chris Christie and Governor-elect Phil Murphy, former Governors Thomas Kean, Donald DiFrancesco, Jim McGreevey, Richard Codey and Jon Corzine and U. S. Representative Bill Pascrell were in attendance. Byrne's remains were cremated and his ashes were interred in Princeton Cemetery.

Legacy

In 2006, Rutgers University's Center on the American Governor of the Eagleton Institute of Politics established the Brendan T. Byrne Archive, an online database containing various resources from the Byrne administration, including original documents and video interviews with Brendan Byrne and members of his administration.

The Brendan T. Byrne State Forest (formerly Lebanon State Forest) is named for him. The Brendan Byrne Arena in the Meadowlands Sports Complex in East Rutherford was also named for him, although it was renamed the Continental Airlines Arena in 1996.

Byrne's son, Tom Byrne, was the New Jersey Democratic State Committee chair in the 1990s and was a prospective candidate for the U.S. Senate race in 2000, before withdrawing in favor of eventual winner Jon Corzine, who later became governor. Brendan's oldest granddaughter, Meaghan, works as a legislative staffer in the U.S. House of Representatives.

In 2011, Byrne was inducted into the New Jersey Hall of Fame along with Queen Latifah, John Travolta, and ten others.

The Man Who Couldn't Be Bought is a biography of Byrne published in 2015.''

References

Further reading

Archival Collections 

 Brendan Byrne papers (The Monsignor Field Archives & Special Collection Center at Seton Hall University) - Contains materials related to Brendan Byrne's campaigns for governor of New Jersey and some personal materials documenting his time as governor and his activities with the Democratic party, primarily from 1973-1977

External links
New Jersey Governor Brendan Thomas Byrne, National Governors Association
 Rutgers Program on the Governor, the Brendan Byrne Archive
 Gone But Not Forgotten: Remembering Governor Brendan Byrne episode from One on One with Steve Adubato

|-

|-

1924 births
2018 deaths
United States Army Air Forces personnel of World War II
American people of Irish descent
Democratic Party governors of New Jersey
Harvard Law School alumni
Military personnel from New Jersey
New Jersey state court judges
People from West Orange, New Jersey
Recipients of the Air Medal
Recipients of the Distinguished Flying Cross (United States)
United States Army Air Forces officers
West Orange High School (New Jersey) alumni
Princeton School of Public and International Affairs alumni
Catholics from New Jersey
20th-century American judges
Respiratory disease deaths in New Jersey
Infectious disease deaths in New Jersey
Deaths from respiratory tract infection